The Mitsubishi G4M was a twin-engine, land-based medium bomber formerly manufactured by the Mitsubishi Aircraft Company, a part of Mitsubishi Heavy Industries, and operated by the Imperial Japanese Navy from 1940 to 1945. The Allied reporting name was "Betty".

Designed to a strict specification to succeed the Mitsubishi G3M already in service, the G4M boasted very good performance and excellent range and was considered the best land-based naval bomber at the time. This was achieved by its structural lightness and an almost total lack of protection for the crew, with no armor plating or self-sealing fuel tanks. The G4M was officially adopted on 2 April 1941 but the aforementioned problems would prove to be a severe drawback, often suffering heavy losses; Allied fighter pilots nicknamed the G4M "The Flying Lighter" as it was extremely prone to ignition after a few hits. It was not until later variants of the G4M2 and G4M3 that self-sealing fuel tanks, armor protection for the crew and better defensive armament was installed.

Nevertheless, the G4M would become the Navy's primary land-based bomber. It is the most widely produced and most famous bomber operated by the Japanese during  World War II and it served in nearly all battles during the Pacific War. Attacks by G4M and G3M bombers resulted in the sinking of the Royal Navy battleship  and battlecruiser , the first time capital ships actively defending themselves were sunk solely by air power while in the open sea. The aircraft is also known for being the mothership that carried the Yokosuka MXY-7 Ohka, a purpose-built anti-ship suicide weapon during the final years of the war. Of the 2,435 G4Ms produced, no intact aircraft have survived.

Design and development

The G4Ms predecessor the Mitsubishi G3M went into service in 1937 in China. Only two months later the Japanese Navy issued specifications to Mitsubishi.

The G4M was designed for a long range and high speed at the time of its introduction. In order to meet the Navy's specifications a Mitsubishi team led by Kiro Honjo did not incorporate self-sealing fuel tanks and armor plating to save weight and extend range. This consequently made both the G4M and the Zero, in which Mitsubishi used the same design features, vulnerable to machine gun and cannon fire. Consequently, this led to Allied fighter pilots giving it derisive nicknames such as "the flying lighter" "the one-shot lighter", "the flying Zippo" and "the flying cigar" because of its tendency to ignite from damage to the wing fuel tanks after being hit by gunfire. The pilots of the Imperial Japanese Navy called the G4M the "hamaki" ("cigar"), although this was due to its shape. Due to deficiencies of the G3M in warding off concentrated fighter attacks Honjo incorporated  guns in the nose, on top and both sides of the fuselage and in the tail a  cannon was added.

When used for medium- to high-altitude bombing against stationary land targets like supply depots, seaports or airfields, it was much harder to intercept. Using its long range and high speed, the G4M could appear from any direction, and then it could be gone before any fighters intercepted them. The 20 mm cannon in its tail turret was much heavier armament than was commonly carried by bombers of either side, making aerial attacks from the rear quite dangerous for the Allied fighter aircraft. Sometimes, if they did not catch fire after being hit in the wings by flak from the ground or by machine gun bullets from enemy fighters, G4Ms also proved to be able to remain airborne despite being badly damaged. For example, after the attack of the 751 Kōkūtai (air group) on the USS Chicago during the Battle of Rennell Island, three out of four surviving aircraft (of the original eleven) returned despite flying with only one engine.

As the war continued improved bomber designs failed to materialize and Mitsubishi began creating additional versions to fulfill various new missions as well as eliminate the weakness in the design including various engine and weapon variants.  The G4M2 redesign failed to rectify the G4M's vulnerability to weapons fire.

First flight
The first G4M prototype left Mitsubishi's Nagoya plant in September 1939 disassembled and loaded in five ox-drawn farm carts to Kagamigahara airfield  to the north. On 23 October 1939, test pilot Katsuzo Shima flew the G4M prototype. Despite successful tests the Navy shelved the bomber for the more heavily armed G6M1 variant in hopes it could be used as heavy escort fighter for other bombers. Failing these expectations the G4M1 was ordered into production.

Production
The first production G4M was completed in April 1941 and was not discontinued until the end of the war.

 G4M1 Model 11: 1172 examples (including prototypes)
 G4M2 models 22, 22 Ko and 22 Otsu: 429 examples
 G4M2a, models 24, 24 Ko, 24 Otsu, 24 Hei, and 24 Tei: 713 examples
 G4M3 models 34 Ko, 34 Otsu, and 34 Hei: 91 examples
 G6M1: 30 examples
 Total production of all versions: 2,435 examples

Operational history

The G4M was similar in performance and missions to other contemporary twin-engine bombers such as the German Heinkel He 111 and the American North American B-25 Mitchell. These were all commonly used in anti-ship roles. The G4M Model 11 was prominent in attacks on Allied shipping from 1941 to early 1944, but after that it became increasingly easy prey for Allied fighters.

The G4M was first used in combat on 13 September 1940 in Mainland China, when 27 "Bettys" and Mitsubishi C5Ms of 1st Rengo Kōkūtai (a mixed force including elements of the Kanoya and Kizarazu Kōkūtai) departed from Taipei, Omura, and Jeju City to attack Hankow. The bombers and the reconnaissance aircraft were escorted by 13 A6M Zeros of 12th Kōkūtai led by the IJN lieutenant, Saburo Shindo. A similar operation occurred in May 1941. In December 1941, 107 G4Ms based on Formosa of 1st Kōkūtai and Kanoya Kōkūtai belonging to the 21st Koku Sentai (air flotilla) crossed the Luzon Strait en route to bombing the Philippines; this was the beginning of Japanese invasions in the Southwest Pacific Theater.

In its first year of combat the G4M was a success. They bombed the U.S. Army air base Clark Field, Philippines on 8 December 1941. The G4M was instrumental in sinking HMS Prince of Wales and HMS Repulse two days later. Nine G4Ms participated in the long-range bombing raid of Katherine, Northern Territory, on 22 March 1942 (the deepest inland attack on Australian territory during the war at over 200 miles from the coast). Against weak fighter opposition the G4M attacked targets ranging as far as the Aleutians to Australia using its long range, the drawbacks of no self-sealing fuel tanks and armor not presenting themselves as problems at this point.

The G4M's most notable use as a torpedo bomber was in the sinking of Prince of Wales and Repulse off the eastern coast of Malaya on 10 December 1941. The G4Ms attacked along with older Mitsubishi G3M "Nell" bombers, which made high-level bombing runs. Prince of Wales and Repulse were the first two capital ships to be sunk exclusively by air attacks during a war, while in open waters.

G4Ms later made many attacks against Allied ships and also land targets during the six-month-long Guadalcanal Campaign (in the Solomon Islands) in late 1942. More than 100 G4M1s and their pilots and crews were lost (with no replacements or substitutes available) during the many battles over and near Guadalcanal from August to October 1942. On 8 August 1942, during the second day of the U.S. Marine landings on Guadalcanal, 23 IJNAF torpedo-carrying G4M1s attacked American ships at Lunga Point, but 18 of the G4M1s were shot down, by very heavy anti-aircraft fire and carrier-based F4F fighters. In all 18 Japanese crews – approximately 120 aviators – were lost at Lunga Point. In the two days of the Battle of Rennell Island, 29 and 30 January 1943, 10 out of 43 G4M1s were shot down during night torpedo attacks, all by U.S. Navy anti-aircraft fire. About 70 Japanese aviators, including Lieutenant Commander Higai, were killed during that battle.

Probably the best-known incident involving a G4M during the war was the attack resulting in the death of Admiral Yamamoto. On 18 April 1943, sixteen P-38 Lightnings of the 339th Fighter Squadron of the 347th Fighter Group, Thirteenth Air Force, shot down a G4M1 of the 705th Kōkūtai with the tailcode T1-323, carrying Admiral Yamamoto. In the same battle, another G4M1 carrying Chief of Staff Vice Admiral Matome Ugaki was also downed by the P-38s, although Ugaki survived.

The G4M Model 11 was replaced by the Models 22, 22a/b, 24a/b, 25, 26, and 27 from June 1943 onward, giving service in New Guinea, the Solomons, and the South Pacific area, in defense of the Marianas and finally in Okinawa. Other G4Ms received field modifications, resulting in the Model 24j. This model carried the Yokosuka MXY7 Ohka Model 11 suicide flying bomb, beginning on 21 March 1945, with disastrous results due to heavy Allied fighter opposition.

After the loss of Okinawa, G4Ms constituted the main weapon of the land-based Japanese naval bomber force. It consisted of 20 Kōkūtai at the end of the war. This included the testing air group, which was equipped in 1944–45 with the latest version G4M3 Models 34 and 36, though these arrived too late to affect the course of the war.

From November 1944 to January 1945, G4Ms were one of the main types of aircraft used in the Japanese air attacks on the Mariana Islands, and plans to use converted G4Ms to land commandos on the islands were developed in mid-1945 and cancelled only at the end of the war.

As part of the negotiations for the surrender of Japan, two demilitarized G4Ms, given the call-signs Bataan 1 and Bataan 2, flew to Ie Shima, carrying the first surrender delegations on the first leg of their flight to Manila. The G4Ms were painted white with green crosses, and were escorted by American P-38 fighters.

The G4M's intended successor was the Yokosuka P1Y Ginga, although because of production problems, the changeover was only begun by the time the war ended.

Variants

G4M1

G4M1 prototypes (Mitsubishi Navy Type 1 attack bomber) / (Mitsubishi Navy Experimental 12-Shi land attacker). Two prototypes built.
G4M1 Model 11 (Mitsubishi Navy Type 1 Attack Bomber Model 11). The first bomber model of series, with  Mitsubishi MK4A "Kasei" Model 11 engines driving three-blade propellers. The following modifications were made during production:
 March 1942: the first aircraft (241st production example) fitted with Mitsubishi MK4E "Kasei" Model 15 engines with larger superchargers for better high altitude performance, became standard in August 1942 from 406th aircraft onwards. These MK4E-engined aircraft have often (erroneously) been referred as the "G4M1 Model 12".
 Summer 1942: propeller spinners introduced
 Spring 1943: outer half of the tail cone cut away in order to improve tail gunner's field of fire.
 August 1943: a completely redesigned tail cone, with reduced framing and wide V-shaped cut out; this form of tail cone was also used in all G4M2 models.
 September 1943: individual exhaust stacks from 954th airframe onwards

Production of the G4M1 ended in January 1944.

G4M2

The first of the four G4M2 prototypes flew in December 1942 (Mitsubishi Navy Type 1 Attack Bomber Model 22). An electrically powered dorsal turret featuring a  Type 99 cannon was introduced in place of G4M1's dorsal position with a  Type 92 machine gun, total guns armed were two  Type 99 cannons (one tail turret, one top turret), and four  Type 92 machine guns (one nose, two waist, and one cockpit side). External differences also included increased nose glazing, flush side gun positions instead of blisters, and rounded tips of wings and tail surfaces. These major improvements also made it possible for the G4M2 to carry more powerful bombs; one  Navy Type 91 Kai-7 aerial torpedo or one  bomb or two  bombs or one  Type 3 No. 31 bomb (ray-detective type bomb) and twelve  bombs. The G4M2 entered service in mid-1943.

G4M2 Model 22 (Mitsubishi Navy Type 1 Attack Bomber Model 22) the base model, the first production example completed in July 1943. Introduced bulged bomb bay doors from 65th aircraft onwards, and an optically flat panel in the nose cone from the 105th aircraft onwards.
G4M2 Model 22Ko (Mitsubishi Navy Type 1 Attack Bomber Model 22 Ko) very similar to previous model. Carried Type 3 Ku Mark 6 search radar and was armed with  Type 99 Model 1 cannon s replacing the  Type 92 machine guns in the lateral positions.
G4M2 Model 22 Otsu (Mitsubishi Navy Type 1 Attack Bomber Model 22 Otsu) dorsal turret cannon changed to longer-barreled  Type 99 Model 2 cannon.
G4M2a Model 24 (Mitsubishi Navy Type 1 Attack Bomber Model 24) modified Model 22, Mitsubishi MK4T Kasei 25  engines, with bulged bomb bay doors as standard for larger bomb capacity. Externally distinguishable from the Model 22 by a carburetor air intake on the top of the engine cowling.
G4M2a Model 24 Ko (Mitsubishi Navy Type 1 Attack Bomber Model 24 Ko) armament similar to Model 22 Ko.
G4M2a Model 24 Otsu (Mitsubishi Navy Type 1 Attack Bomber Model 24 Otsu) armament similar to Model 22 Otsu.
G4M2a Model 24 Hei (Mitsubishi Navy Type 1 Attack Bomber Model 24 Hei) modified 24 Otsu, with one  Type 2 machine gun mounted in tip of the nose cone, radar antenna relocated from that position to above the nose cone.
G4M2b Model 25(Mitsubishi Navy Type 1 Attack Bomber Model 25) one G4M2a modified to Mitsubishi MK4T-B Kasei 25 Otsu  engines. Only experimental.
G4M2c Model 26 (Mitsubishi Navy Type 1 Attack Bomber Model 26) two G4M2as modified to Mitsubishi MK4T-B Ru Kasei 25b  engines with turbochargers.
G4M2d Model 27 (Mitsubishi Navy Type 1 Attack Bomber Model 27) one G4M2 modified to Mitsubishi MK4V Kasei 27  engines.
G4M2e Model 24 Tei (Mitsubishi Navy Type 1 Attack Bomber Model 24 Tei) special version for the transport of the ramming attack bomb plane Kugisho/Yokosuka MXY-7 Ohka ("Baka") Model 11, conversions of G4M2a Model 24 Otsu and 24 Hei. Had armour protection for the pilots and fuselage fuel tanks.
MXY11 (Yokosuka Navy Type 1 attack bomber ground decoy) ground decoy non-flying replica of Mitsubishi G4M2 developed by Yokosuka

G4M3
G4M3 Model 34 (Mitsubishi Navy Type 1 Attack Bomber Model 34 Tei) redesigned G4M2 with added self-sealing fuel tanks, improved armor protection and an entirely new tail gunner's compartment similar to that of late model B-26 Marauders. Wings were also redesigned and the horizontal tailplane was given dihedral. Armed with two  Type 92 machine guns in nose cabin and in both side positions, and one  Type 99 Model 1 cannon in dorsal turret and tail. Entered production in October 1944 in G4M3a Model 34 Ko form with  Type 99 cannon in side positions instead of machine guns.
G4M3a Model 34 Hei (Mitsubishi Navy Type 1 Attack Bomber Model 34 Hei) similar modifications as in corresponding Model 24 variants.
G4M3a Model 34 Otsu (Mitsubishi Navy Type 1 Attack Bomber Model 34 Otsu) similar modifications as in corresponding Model 24 variants.
G4M3 Model 36 (Mitsubishi Navy Type 1 Attack Bomber Model 36) prototype. Two G4M2 Model 34 modified to Mitsubishi MK4-T Kasei 25b Ru  engines.

G6M1

G6M1 (Mitsubishi Navy Type 1 wingtip convoy fighter) initial model of the series, armed with three  Type 99 cannon (two in a belly blister, one in the tail) and one  Type 92 machine gun in the nose; 30 built.
G6M1-K(Mitsubishi Navy Type 1 large land trainer) trainers converted from G6M1s.
G6M1-L2(Mitsubishi Navy Type 1 transport) G6M1s modified as transports.

Operators

 Imperial Japanese Navy Air Service operated the type during 1941–45 in a total of 37 Kōkūtai (air groups).

Postwar

 
 Indonesian Air Force
 
 People's Liberation Army Air Force

 Republic of China Air Force  at least one G4M2 captured at Tainan Naval Airbase
 
 Royal Air Force operated at least one captured aircraft for evaluation purposes.
 
 United States Army Air Force, like the RAF, operated captured aircraft for evaluation.

Surviving aircraft

No flyable Mitsubishi G4Ms are left although several wrecks remain scattered in southeast Asia and on Pacific islands.
G4M1 Model 11 (Serial #1280): On display in a diorama at the Planes of Fame Air Museum in Chino, California in an unrestored condition.  The only complete G4M Betty bomber. Built in Nagoya Works No. 3 on 16 April 1942, tail number 370, which had probably crash landed before mid-1944, and was recovered from Babo Airfield, Indonesia, in 1991.
G4M1 Model 11 (Serial #1800): Assigned to the 701st Naval Air Group. Abandoned on Ballale Airfield. During August 2018, it was recovered from Ballale Island in the Solomon Islands, along with another G4M1 (Serial #2806) and the fuselage of an early model G4M1 by a "foreign salvager."
G4M1 Model 11 (Serial #2806): Tail code U-321, was assigned to the Misawa Naval Air Group in the Solomon Islands from Ballale Airfield. Was abandoned on a revetment, next to a bomb crater, both engines missing. During August 2018 it was recovered by a "foreign salvager" along with another G4M1 Betty Model 11 (Serial #1800) and a fuselage of an early model G4M1. Since late January 2021 was on display at Markwarth Collection / Solomon Islands War Museum (SIWM) with a tail section attached, possibly with that of the early model G4M1.

Several other locations display pieces of G4Ms including the restored fuselage of a G4M2 is on display at the Kawaguchiko Motor Museum in Yamanashi Prefecture, Japan.

Additionally the Smithsonian Institution retains the forward fuselage of a G4M3 Betty Model 34. Likely based in Oppama Air Field near Yokosuka, Japan there is no recorded tail number. The aircraft was part of 145 other Japanese aircraft for tests and evaluations by the U.S. Navy. After being flight tested as "Foreign Equipment Test number T2-2205" the airplane was dismembered by a cutting torch for unknown reasons.

The wreck of Admiral Yamamoto's G4M1 Model 11 (Serial #2656) tail code 323 were still present at the crash site in the jungle near Panguna, Bougainville Island, with some parts and artifacts recovered and displayed at the museums in Papua New Guinea, Australia, and Japan. The wreck consisted of rear fuselage section and vertical stabilizer along with parts of the wings and engines. The crash site is accessible via prior arrangement to the landowners.

Specifications (G4M1, Model 11)

See also

References

Notes

Citations

Bibliography

 Aoki, Hideo. "Kugisho Suicide Attacker "Oka" (MXY7) Baka." Airreview's Japanese Navy Aircraft in the Pacific War. Tokyo:  Kantosha Co. Ltd., 1972.
 Aoki, Hideo. "Mitsubishi Type 1 Attack Bomber (G4M) Betty." Airreview's Japanese Navy Aircraft In The Pacific War. Tokyo:  Kantosha Co. Ltd., 1972.
 Bridgwater, H.C. and Peter Scott. Combat Colours Number 4: Pearl Harbor and Beyond, December 1941 to May 1942. Luton, Bedfordshire, UK: Guideline Publications, 2001. .
 Chant, Chris. Aircraft Of World War Two. London: Grange Books PLC., 2001. .
 Ferkl, Martin. Mitsubishi G4M Betty (in English). Praha, Czech Republic: Revi Publications, 2002. .
 
  (new edition 1987 by Putnam Aeronautical Books, .)
 Francillon, PhD., René J. Mitsubishi G4M "Betty" & Okha Bomb (Aircraft in Profile 210). Windsor, Berkshire, UK: Profile Publications Ltd., 1971.
 Fumio, Iwaya. Chuko (Medium Attack Bomber). Tokyo: Hara Shobo, 1958.
 Green, William. Famous Bombers of the Second World War. London: Macdonald and Jane's Publishers Ltd., 1975 (Second edition of 1959 book, reprinted at least twice: 1976 and 1977). .
 Gunston, Bill. The Illustrated Encyclopedia of Combat Aircraft of World War II. London: Salamander Books Ltd., (Third impression ) 1979. .
 Horodyski, Joseph M. "British Gamble In Asian Waters". Military Heritage.  Volume 3, No. 3, December 2001, pp. 68–77. (sinking of the British battleship Prince of Wales and battlecruiser Repulse by Japanese on 10 December 1941 upon U.S. entry into World War II).
 Morgan, Eric B. "Mitsubishi G4M Betty." Twentyfirst Profile, Vol. 2, No. 17. New Milton, Hantfordshire, UK: 21st Profile Ltd., .
 Nowicki, Jacek. Mitsubishi G4M "Betty" (in Polish). Warszawa, Poland: Wydawnictwo Militaria, 1998. .
 Tagaya, Osamu. Mitsubishi Type 1 Rikko Betty Units of World War 2. London: Osprey Publishing, 2001. .
 Thorpe, Donald W. Japanese Naval Air Force Camouflage and Markings World War II. Fallbrook, California: Aero Publishers Inc., 1977.  (pbk.),  (hc.).
 Wheeler, Barry C. The Hamlyn Guide to Military Aircraft Markings. London: Chancellor Press, 1992. .

External links

 Technical Air Intelligence Center Summary No. 7: Betty 22--G4M2

G4M, Mitsubishi
G4M
G4M
World War II Japanese torpedo bombers
Mid-wing aircraft
Aircraft first flown in 1939
Twin piston-engined tractor aircraft